John T. Sebastian, Jr. (November 20, 1921 – April 26, 2003) was an American professional basketball player. He played in numerous leagues, including the National Basketball League. In the NBL, Sebastian played for the Syracuse Nationals, Hammond Calumet Buccaneers, and Detroit Vagabond Kings and averaged 8.0 points per game. At one time he held the Guinness Record for consecutive made free throws made (63).

References 

1921 births
2003 deaths
American men's basketball players
United States Navy personnel of World War II
Basketball players from Illinois
Detroit Vagabond Kings players
Guards (basketball)
Hammond Calumet Buccaneers players
High school basketball coaches in the United States
People from Marion County, Illinois
Professional Basketball League of America players
Southern Illinois Salukis men's basketball players
Syracuse Nationals players